The men's 5000 meter at the 2017 KNSB Dutch Single Distance Championships took place in Heerenveen at the Thialf ice skating rink on Wednesday 28 December 2016. There were 18 participants.

Statistics

Result

Source:

Referee: Dina Melis 
Starter: Raymond Micka 
Start: 16:35 hr. Finish: 17:59 hr.

Draw

References

Single Distance Championships
2017 Single Distance